

References

Government of Zimbabwe
2009 establishments in Zimbabwe
Cabinets established in 2009